KCFS-LP is a low-power radio station licensed by the Camelon Foundation that broadcasts a variety format from El Dorado Hills, California. The station began broadcasting on February 6, 2017.

References

External links

El Dorado County, California
Radio stations established in 2017
2017 establishments in California
CFS-LP
Variety radio stations in the United States
CFS-LP